Głowaczów may refer to the following places in Poland:
Głowaczów, Lower Silesian Voivodeship (south-west Poland)
Głowaczów, Masovian Voivodeship (east-central Poland)